The Fairtrade Foundation is a charity based in the United Kingdom that aims to empower disadvantaged producers in developing countries by tackling injustice in conventional trade, in particular by promoting and licensing the Fairtrade Mark, a guarantee that products retailed in the UK have been produced in accordance with internationally agreed Fairtrade standards. The foundation is the British member of FLO International, which unites FLO-CERT, 25 National Fairtrade Organisations and 3 Producer Networks across Europe, Asia, Latin America, North America, Africa, Australia and New Zealand.

The organisation is an independent non-profit organisation that licenses use of the Fairtrade Mark on products in the UK in accordance with internationally agreed Fairtrade standards.

Areas of activity 
Its four key areas of activity include:
 Providing independent certification of the trade chain for products, and licensing use of the Fairtrade Mark on products as a consumer guarantee.
 Growing demand for Fairtrade products and supporting producers to sell to traders and retailers.
 Working with partners to support producer organisations and their networks.
 Raising awareness of the need for fair trade in the public and the role of the Fairtrade Mark in making trade fair.

How it works

The marketing system for Fairtrade and non-Fairtrade products is identical in the consuming countries, using mostly the same importing, packing, distributing and retailing firms. Some independent brands operate a virtual company, paying importers, packers and distributors and advertising agencies to handle their brand, for cost reasons. In the producing country Fairtrade is marketed only by Fairtrade certified cooperatives, however if there is not enough market demand, those products are sold onto the conventional market at market prices, marketed by Fairtrade certified cooperatives (as uncertified), by other cooperatives and by ordinary traders.

This mode of operation has led to criticism of the foundation. It is argued that, because retailers and cafes in the rich countries can sell Fairtrade coffee at any price they like, nearly all the extra price paid by consumers, 82% to 99%, is kept in the rich countries as increased profit. There is evidence that dishonest importers do not pay the full Fairtrade price, so an even smaller proportion reaches the Third World. Fairtrade operates a system whereby such allegations are reported to FLOCert for investigation.   

Cooperative traders and exporters can only sell produce on Fairtrade terms if they meet the set of standards set by Fairtrade International that demand minimum requirements to criteria such as pricing and terms of trade. Farmers pay FLOCERT a certification and inspection fee. Other administration costs and production costs are incurred to meet these standards. Commodity prices can drop when the world market is oversupplied. A minimum price, which is paid to producers, acts as a safety net for farmers at times when world markets fall below a sustainable level. An additional sum of money, called the Fairtrade Premium, is paid to farmers for products sold on Fairtrade terms. Some cooperatives can sell only a third of their output as Fairtrade, because of lack of market demand, and sell the rest at world prices. As the additional costs are incurred on all production, not just that sold as Fairtrade, cooperatives sometimes lose money on their Fairtrade membership.  After the certification fees have been subtracted from the overall income earned on Fairtrade terms, the rest goes into a communal fund for workers and farmers to use as decided democratically within the farmers' organisation, or by a workers' committee on a plantation. The additional sum (Fairtrade Premium) is invested in ‘social projects’ such as clinics, women's groups and baseball pitches.

Critics therefore argue that farmers do not get any of the higher price under Fairtrade.  Nor is there any evidence that they get higher prices as a result of better marketing: the cooperatives sometimes pay farmers a higher price than farmers do, sometimes less, but there is no evidence on which is more common.  Farmers do, however, incur extra costs in producing Fairtrade, so they certainly do lose money from Fairtrade membership in some cases. There is little or no research on the extra costs incurred, or the effect of Fairtrade membership on the income of farmers. However, research by Overseas Development Institute found that a "wide variety of qualitative studies have found positive effects of Fairtrade certification on the incomes of producers". 

Other economists have argued that the existence of a fair trade marketing route benefits producers by raising producer prices generally, and there is evidence of such an effect at least among coffee producers; according to Podhorsky, the critics of the Fairtrade Foundation err by assuming that fair trade producers receive the world price for coffee, when that is in general not so.

To become certified Fairtrade producers, the primary cooperative and its member farmers must operate to certain Fairtrade standards, set by the organisation. FLO-CERT, the for-profit side, handles producer certification, inspecting and certifying producer organisations in more than 50 countries in Africa, Asia, and Latin America. In the Fair trade debate there are many complaints of failure to enforce these standards, with Fairtrade cooperatives, importers and packers profiting by evading them.

Organisational links
The foundation was established in 1992 by CAFOD, Christian Aid, New Consumer, Oxfam, Traidcraft and the World Development Movement. These organisations were later joined by the Women's Institute, Britain's largest women's organisation, and other organisations including Banana Link, Methodist Relief and Development Fund, Nicaragua Solidarity Campaign, People & Planet, SCIAF, Shared Interest Foundation, Soroptimist International, Tearfund and the United Reformed Church.

Promotion
The Fairtrade Foundation organises and coordinates promotional campaigns and events every year, such as the Fairtrade Fortnight (typically in February/March). The foundation also coordinates the Fairtrade Town campaign, which designates areas and towns committed to the promotion of Fairtrade certified goods.

The Fairtrade Foundation's current campaign aims to highlight the goal of achieving living incomes for cocoa farmers in West Africa.

Market penetration
Since The Co-operative Food became the first supermarket to sell a Fairtrade product (Cafedirect coffee) in 1992, both the range and total sales of Fairtrade certified products in UK supermarkets has grown extensively. In 2013, there were over 4000 Fairtrade products available in the UK with estimated sales of over £1.7bn. Products carrying the Fairtrade label can be found at a wide range of well known supermarkets, as well as in hundreds of coffee shops, small retailers and online merchants.

In 2014, Fairtrade certified sales in the United Kingdom amounted to an estimated retail value of £1.68 billion, up from £273 million in 2006. Volumes of Fairtrade banana sales grew by 3% in 2014, generating an estimated £7.9 million of Fairtrade premium. One in three bananas bought in the United Kingdom carries the Fairtrade label. Fairtrade sales of coffee, which remains Fairtrade's best known product, rose 9% generating an estimated £5 million of Fairtrade premium in 2014.

It was estimated in 2014 that approximately 77% of British adults could identify the Fairtrade Certification Mark, up from 25% in 2003, 39% in 2004, 50% in 2005 and 57% in 2007.  In 2008, an estimated two in three UK households regularly bought at least one Fairtrade-labelled product, and it is raising! 

The Fairtrade Foundation is a registered charity (no. 1043886). It is also a company limited by guarantee, registered in England and Wales (no. 2733136).

Where it takes place

References

External links 
The Fairtrade Foundation
The Fairtrade Foundation's Fairtrade at Work Campaign

Fair trade organizations
Foundations based in the United Kingdom
Organisations based in the City of London
Organizations established in 1992

sv:Rättvisemärkt